Kanoroba is a town in northern Ivory Coast. It is a sub-prefecture of Korhogo Department in Poro Region, Savanes District.

Kanoroba was a commune until March 2012, when it became one of 1126 communes nationwide that were abolished.

In 2014, the population of the sub-prefecture of Kanoroba was 18,555.

Villages
The 16 villages of the sub-prefecture of Kanoroba and their population in 2014 are:

Notes

Sub-prefectures of Poro Region
Former communes of Ivory Coast